General elections were held in Siam on 7 November 1937 to elect 91 members of the 182-seat House of Representatives, with the other 91 appointed by the King. Unlike the 1933 elections, which had been carried out on an indirect basis, the 1937 elections were direct.

At the time there were no political parties, so all candidates ran as independents. Voter turnout was 40.2%.

Background
Shortly before the end of the term of the parliament elected in 1933, the second Prime Minister Phraya Phahonphonphayuhasena announced his resignation following questions in the House of Representatives regarding the land purchase of the Crown Property Bureau. However, on 9 August 1937, a royal command through the Board of Regents reappointing Phahonphonphayuhasena.

Results

Aftermath
On 21 December Phahonphonphayuhasena received a royal command reappointing him as prime minister. He formed a new cabinet with eighteen members. It was his eighth and final cabinet.

References

Siam
General
Elections in Thailand
Election and referendum articles with incomplete results
Non-partisan elections